Banga is a town in the Bilanga Department of Gnagna Province, Burkina Faso. The town is located in the east of the country and has a population of 1,485.

References

Populated places in the Est Region (Burkina Faso)
Gnagna Province